Widower with Five Daughters is a 1957 West German comedy film directed by Erich Engels and starring Heinz Erhardt, Susanne Cramer, and Helmuth Lohner. It was shot at Göttingen Studios, with location shooting at Berlepsch Castle near Witzenhausen. The art directors Dieter Bartels and Paul Markwitz designed the film's sets.

Plot
A father has brought up his five daughters alone since the death of his wife, while also administering a castle which is now owned by an American. He sometimes receives the help of a local woman, leading to the mixed reactions of his daughters as they consider her as a prospective new mother.

Cast
Heinz Erhardt as Friedrich Scherzer
Susanne Cramer as Karin Scherzer
Helmuth Lohner as Dr. Klaus Hellmann
Lotte Rausch as Frau Hansen
 as Marie Scherzer
Vera Tschechowa as Anne Scherzer
Elke Aberle as Julchen Scherzer
Christine Kaufmann as Ulla Scherzer
Michael Lang as Altfeld
Peter Vogel as Fred
Alexander von Richthofen as Jäcky
Marina Ried as Frau Kostowitsch
Carsta Löck as Frl. Nessel
 as Meta Sengstake
Maly Delschaft as Berta Sengstake
 as Frl. Forsch
Chris Howland as Mr. Printice
 as Amtmann Stoelz
 as singer
Iván Petrovich as Mr. Pfefferkorn

References

External links

1957 comedy films
German comedy films
West German films
Films directed by Erich Engels
1950s German-language films
1950s German films
Films shot at Göttingen Studios